The Republic of Togo is divided into five regions which are subdivided into 35 prefectures. These various prefectures of Togo are shown according to their respective regions below.

List of prefectures by region

Savanes

Kpendjal Prefecture
Oti Prefecture
Tandjouaré Prefecture
Tône Prefecture
Cinkassé Prefecture

Kara

Assoli Prefecture
Bassar Prefecture
Bimah Prefecture (or Binah)
Dankpen Prefecture
Doufelgou Prefecture
Kéran Prefecture
Kozah Prefecture (or Koza)

Plateaux

Agou Prefecture
Amou Prefecture
Danyi Prefecture
Est-Mono Prefecture
Haho Prefecture
Kloto Prefecture
Moyen-Mono Prefecture
Ogou Prefecture
Wawa Prefecture
Akébou Prefecture
Anié Prefecture
Kpélé Prefecture

Centrale

Blitta Prefecture
Sotouboua Prefecture
Tchamba Prefecture
Tchaoudjo Prefecture

Maritime

Avé Prefecture
Golfe Prefecture
Lacs Prefecture
Vo Prefecture
Yoto Prefecture
Zio Prefecture
Bas-Mono Prefecture

See also
 Regions of Togo

References
 

 
Subdivisions of Togo
Togo, Prefectures
Togo 2
Prefectures, Togo
Togo geography-related lists